Reading Football Club played the season 2004–05 in the Football League Championship.

Review and events

Reading started the season brightly. However, injury to the three strikers, Dave Kitson, Nicky Forster and Shaun Goater, meant that the goals dried up and they slipped down the league. For much of the season Ivar Ingimarsson, a centre back, was the club's main source of goals. However, Kitson's return, coupled with the signings of veterans and former England internationals Les Ferdinand and Martin Keown meant that the club broke a run of 11 league games without a win against West Ham. Reading won 3–1, with a Dave Kitson hat-trick. Reading just missed out on a playoff spot on the last day of the season, losing 3–1 to Wigan. Dave Kitson was the club's top scorer, with 19 goals.

Squad

Out on loan

Left club during season

Transfers

In

Out

Loans out

Released

Competitions

Overview

Championship

Results summary

Results by round

Results

League table

FA Cup

League Cup

Squad statistics

Appearances and goals

|-
|colspan="14"|Players away on loan:

|-
|colspan="14"|Players who left Reading during the season:

|}

Goal scorers

Clean sheets

Disciplinary record
Source: Soccernet

References

Reading F.C. seasons
Reading